Bambara or Bambarra may refer to:
 Bambara people, an ethnic group, primarily in Mali
 Bambara language, their language, a Manding language
 Bamana Empire, a state that flourished in present-day Mali (1640s–1861)
 Bambara (beetle), a genus of feather-winged beetles
 Bambara groundnut, a traditional food crop in Africa (Vigna subterranea)
 Bambarra, a settlement on Middle Caicos, Turks and Caicos Islands
 Bambara (band), a New York post-punk band

Persons with the surname
 Toni Cade Bambara (1939–1995), American author, social activist, and college professor

See also 
 Mbabaram (disambiguation), an Australian people and language

Language and nationality disambiguation pages